This is a list of awards and nominations received by English actress Naomie Harris.

Major associations

Academy Awards

BAFTA Award

Golden Globe Awards

Screen Actors Guild Awards

Other awards and nominations

Black Reel Awards

British Independent Film Awards

Critics' Choice Movie Awards

Essence Awards

Glamour Awards

Gotham Independent Film Awards

Golden Nymph

Golden Raspberry Awards

Hollywood Film Awards

Independent Spirit Awards

London Film Critics Circle Awards

NAACP Awards

National Board of Review

Satellite Awards

Washington DC Film Critics Association Awards

References

External links
 

Lists of awards received by British actor